The 2019 Purdue Boilermakers football team represented Purdue University during the 2019 NCAA Division I FBS football season. The Boilermakers played their home games at Ross–Ade Stadium in West Lafayette, Indiana and competed in the West Division of the Big Ten Conference. They were led by third-year head coach Jeff Brohm. They finished the season 4–8, 3–6 in Big Ten play to finish in a tie for fifth place in the West Division.

Previous season
The 2018 Boilermakers team finished the season at 6–7, 5–4 in Big Ten play to finish in a tie for second in the West Division. They were invited to the Music City Bowl where they were defeated by Auburn. The season was highlighted by a dominant, upset home victory over then-No. 2 Ohio State by a score of 49–20, which proved to be the Buckeyes' only loss on the year.

Preseason

Coaching changes   

Purdue cornerbacks coach Derrick Jackson and tight ends coach Mark Tommerdahl both left to take jobs at Northern Illinois and Texas Tech respectively in early February 2019. Purdue announced the hiring of Greg Brown as cornerbacks coach on February 21. He previously was the secondary coach at Auburn for two seasons. Head coach Jeff Brohm also announced the promotion of former Purdue quality control assistant Ryan Wallace to be the new tight ends coach.

Player news

Wide receiver KeyRon Catlett announced his decision to transfer to Hampton. Tight end Jess Trussell and offensive lineman Michael Mendez announced that they would leave as graduate transfers. Linebacker Tobias Larry transferred to Tennessee State. Benaiah Franklin transferred to Northwestern State.

Recruiting

The Boilermakers signed a total of 24 recruits.

Award watch lists
Listed in the order that they were released

Preseason Big Ten poll
Although the Big Ten Conference has not held an official preseason poll since 2010, Cleveland.com has polled sports journalists representing all member schools as a de facto preseason media poll since 2011. For the 2019 poll, Purdue was projected to finish in fifth in the West Division.

Schedule
Purdue's 2019 schedule will begin with three non-conference games, first on the road against Nevada of the Mountain West Conference, and then returning home for games against Vanderbilt of the Southeastern Conference (SEC) and TCU of the Big 12 Conference. In Big Ten Conference play, Purdue will play all other members of the West Division and draws Penn State, Maryland, and Indiana from the East Division.

Source:

Roster

Game summaries

Nevada

 Sources:

    
    
    
    
    
    
    
    
    
    

To begin the season, Purdue traveled to Nevada, the first time Purdue has played in Reno.

Purdue lost to Nevada, 34–31. Purdue scored the first 10 points in the first quarter via 2-yard touchdown pass from Elijah Sindelar to Brycen Hopkins and a 32-yard field goal by J. D. Dellinger. Nevada responded with points in the second quarter via a 38-yard touchdown pass from Carson Strong to Dominic Christian. Purdue extended its lead in the second quarter via a 38-yard touchdown reception by Jackson Anthrop and a 39-yard touchdown reception by Rondale Moore, both passes coming from Sindelar. Purdue two touchdowns made the score 24–7 in favor of Purdue at half-time. Nevada added a 21-yard touchdown reception by Elijah Cooks in the third quarter. Purdue responded just 30 seconds later with a 49-yard touchdown reception by David Bellfrom Sindelar. Nevada closed out the third quarter scoring following a 34-yard field goal from Talton in the third quarter. Nevada reduced Purdue's lead to seven points with just 6:56 remaining following a 7-yard touchdown run from Toa Taua. Following a Purdue punt, Nevada drove 87-yards with the final play being a 21-yard Elijah Cooks touchdown reception from Strong to tie the game with :52 remaining. On Purdue's second play of their final possession, Sindelar was intercepted by Daniel Brown. Talton was then able to connect on a 56-yard field goal as time expired to give Nevada their first lead of the game, and a victory.

Purdue was minus-5 in turnover margin, just the third time since 2000 that Purdue had five or more turnovers while its opponent had zero. Purdue's 519 yards of offense were the fifth most in a loss since the 2000 season.

Vanderbilt

 Sources:

After opening the season in Nevada, Purdue returned home for their second game against Vanderbilt. The two schools have not played each other since 1942.

Purdue defeated Vanderbilt, 42–24. Vanderbilt scored first in the first quarter via 1-yard touchdown run by Ke'Shawn Vaughn. Purdue responded with at 12-yard touchdown reception by Brycen Hopkins from Elijah Sindelar. Purdue took the lead in the second quarter via a 2-yard touchdown reception by Payne Durham from Sindelar. Vanderbilt added a 48-yard Ryley Guay field goal to make the score 14–10 in favor of Purdue at half-time. Purdue extended its lead on a 50-yard touchdown reception by Jared Sparks and a 20-yard touchdown by Hopkins in the third quarter. Vanderbilt responded with a 10-yard touchdown reception by Cam Johnson from Riley Neal, but failed to convert on the two-point conversion attempt, to open the fourth quarter scoring. Purdue responded with a 34-yard touchdown reception by Rondale Moore from Sindelar. Vanderbilt countered just 9 seconds later when Neal found Chris Pierce on a 75-yard touchdown pass, this time Neal's pass to Kalija Lipscomb was a successful two-point conversion. Purdue concluded the scoring on a 1-yard touchdown run with by Sindelar.

Sindelar's 509 yards passing tied for the sixth most in a game in school history. Purdue's 42 points were its most points ever scored against current members of the SEC. The following Monday, Elijah Sindelar was named the Big Ten Conference Offensive Player of the Week.

TCU

 Sources:

After defeating Vanderbilt, Purdue remained at home for their third game against TCU. The two schools have not played each other since 1970.

TCU won in a blowout, 34–13. Purdue opened the scoring with a 31-yard field goal by J. D. Dellinger. TCU responded with a 24-yard field goal by Jonathan Song. Darius Anderson broke loose to score on a 32-yard run to finish the first quarter scoring. Purdue responded in the second quarter when Dellinger hit a 53-yard field goal. TCU would score again just before the half on a 40-yard Song field goal to make the score 13–6 in favor of TCU at halftime. TCU struck first in the second half when Max Duggan found Al'Dontre Davis for a 22-yard touchdown catch. TCU scored again on a 1-yard touchdown run by Sewo Olonilua to round out the 3rd quarter scoring. Anderson scored again for TCU on an 8-yard run to increase the lead in the 4th quarter. Purdue scored their first touchdown when Jack Plummer found Amad Anderson for a 54-yard touchdown pass.

Purdue's 23 yards rushing were its fewest since having 23 against Minnesota on November 5, 2016. Purdue's 8 first downs were its fewest since having eight against Wisconsin on October 31, 2009. Jack Plummer and Amad Anderson both go the first touchdowns of their careers when Plummer found Anderson for a 54-yard reception in the 4th quarter. J. D. Dellinger's 53-yard field goal was the third longest in school history. George Karlaftis became the first true freshman to record a sack and interception in the same game since Torri Williams on November 6, 2004.

Minnesota

 Sources:

After facing TCU, Purdue remained at home for their four-game and Big Ten Conference opener against Minnesota.

Minnesota won, 38–31. Rodney Smith opened the scoring for Minnesota with a 2-yard touchdown run. Purdue responded with a 21-yard field goal by J. D. Dellinger. The Golden Gophers then extended their lead when Tanner Morgan found Chris Autman-Bell for a 70-yard touchdown pass. On Purdue's next drive, Elijah Sindelar and Rondale Moore both left the game on the same play. Following their departure, Jack Plummer lead the Boilermakers down the field to score on a 7-yard pass to Zander Horvath. Morgan found Rashod Bateman for a 45-yard touchdown, and Tyler Johnson on a 4-yard touchdown to bring the halftime score to 28–10 in favor of Minnesota. Purdue opened the second half scoring when King Doeroe scored on an 8-yard run. Minnesota then connected on a 32-yard field goal by Michael Lantz and Morgan found Bateman on a 47-yard touchdown pass to round out the third quarter scoring. Purdue would add two touchdowns by Doeroe in the fourth quarter, a 2-yard touchdown run and 13-yard reception from Plummer.

Jack Plummer's 7-yard pass to Zander Horvath in the 2nd quarter was his first career touchdown pass, as well as Horvath's first career touchdown reception. George Karlaftis  became the first Purdue freshman since 2000 with at least 3.0 sacks in a season. David Bell became the fifth true freshman since 2000 with at least eight catches in a game. King Doeroe became the first true freshman with three touchdowns in a game since Kory Sheets had three against Indiana on November 19, 2005.

Penn State

 Sources:

After facing Minnesota, Purdue traveled to University Park, Pennsylvania for the 2nd road game and Big Ten Conference game against Penn State.

Penn State won in a blowout, 35–7. Penn State opened up the scoring in the first quarter with a 2-yard touchdown run by K. J. Hamler. After a Purdue punt, the Nittany Lions scored again on a 3-yard run by Sean Clifford. Penn State would strike again in the first with a 72-yard reception by Jahan Dotson from Clifford. Penn State scored first again in the second quarter with a 7-yard reception by Pat Freiermuth. Purdue finally got on the board with a 15-yard touchdown reception by Amad Anderson Jr. from Jack Plummer, bringing the halftime score to 28–7. The lone score of the second half came during a 2-yard touchdown run by Noah Cain in the fourth quarter.

Maryland

 Sources:
    
    
    
    
    
    
    
    
    

After traveling to Penn State, Purdue returned home for their Big Ten Conference game against Maryland.

Purdue won in a blowout, 40–14. Purdue scored first when Jack Plummer found David Bell, but a bad snap forced Danny Corollo to scramble and the PAT was failed. On their next possession, King Doeroe scored on a 4-yard run for the Boilermakers. Maryland scored their first points in the second quarter on a 21-yard run by Javon Leake. Purdue returned the score with a 59-yard touchdown reception by Milton Wright from Plummer. Maryland cut the deficit when Tyrrell Pigrome scored on a 61-yard run. J. D. Dellinger increased the Purdue lead when he added a 27-yard field goal. A Pigrome interception by Cory Trice returned for 37-yard touchdown to bring the halftime score 30–14 in favor of the Boilermakers. Dellinger's 27-yard field goal was the lone score of the third quarter. Plummer found Bell again for an 8-yard touchdown in the 4th quarter to cap the scoring.

Four freshmen scored all five touchdowns. It marked the first time since at least 1997 that even three freshmen scored a touchdown in a game. It was also the first time since December 31, 2001, vs. Washington State that Purdue had at least three players with at least eight receptions. Cory Trice returned an interception for a touchdown just before halftime, becoming the first Purdue freshman with a pick-six since Ricardo Allen in 2010 at Michigan State.

Iowa

 Sources:

Purdue hit the road again, this time traveling to Iowa City, Iowa for a Big Ten Conference game against the Hawkeyes of Iowa.

Iowa defeated Purdue, 26–20. Iowa scored on a pair of Keith Duncan field goals from 30 and 44-yards. Duncan added another field goal in the second from 42-yards. Purdue finally got on the board when Jack Plummer found David Bell from 7-yards out to bring the halftime score to 9–7 in favor of the Hawkeyes. Iowa got the lone score of the 3rd quarter when Tyler Goodson scored on a 1-yard touchdown run. Purdue got the first two scores of the fourth quarter on field goals of 27 and 36-yards from J. D. Dellinger to cut the lead to 6. Iowa scored again on a 14-yard Mekhi Sargent touchdown. Plummer would find Payne Durham in the endzone for a 1-yard touchdown pass, but Purdue failed to recover the onside kick, allowing Iowa to run out the clock.

Illinois

 Sources:

Purdue returned home for their 8th game of the year to renew the rivalry against Illinois for the Purdue Cannon.

Illinois won 24–6. Illinois opened the scoring when James McCourt made a 38-yard field goal. Illinois would score again when Tony Adams intercepted a Jack Plummer pass and returned it 13-yards for a touchdown. Illinois struck again just before the half, when Brandon Peters scored on a 1-yard quarterback sneak to bring the halftime score to 17–0. Illinois increased their lead when Reggie Corbin scored on a 20-yard run. Purdue finally got on the board when Aidan O'Connell found Payne Durham for an 11-yard touchdown pass.

Nebraska

 Sources:

Purdue would remain at home again to face division-rival, Nebraska.

Purdue won 31–27. Nebraska struck first when Dedrick Mills scored on a 1-yard touchdown run. Barret Pickering would add a 23-yard field goal to round out the first quarter scoring. Purdue finally got their first score of the game in the second quarter when Jack Plummer found King Doerue for a touchdown from 3 yards out. Purdue would take its first lead when Plummer found Payne Durham who made two defenders miss on his way to the endzone from 16-yards out, bringing the halftime score to 14–10. The Cornhuskers and Boilermakers would trade field goals of 21 and 44 yards respectively in the third quarter. Nebraska would take the lead back from Purdue in the 4th quarter when Adrian Martinez scored on a 2-yard run. Purdue would respond with a Doerue touchdown run of 7-yards. Martinez scored again from 4-yards out. Purdue would take the lead for good with 1:08 left in the game on a reverse touchdown run by David Bell.

Freshman have scored the last 16 touchdowns Purdue has scored. Purdue ran for a season-high 145-yards. King Doerue became the first player since Ralph Bolden in 2009 with multiple games of at least one rush touchdown and one receiving touchdown, and the only freshman since at least 1997). David Bell surpassed 50 catches on the season, now with 51. He also became only the fourth Purdue player since 1997 with at
least seven receptions and a rushing touchdown in the same game (Rondale Moore, Dorien Bryant, Kory Sheets)

Northwestern

 Sources:

Purdue would next travel to Evanston, Illinois, to face the reigning Big Ten West division champions, the Northwestern Wildcats.

Purdue defeated Northwestern, 24–22. Northwestern got on the board first when Kyric McGowan got loose on a 79-yard touchdown run. Jace James would add a 16-yard touchdown pass from Aidan Smith to round out the first quarter scoring. Purdue finally got their first score of the game in the second quarter when King Doerue scored a touchdown from 12 yards out. Purdue would take a safety when Aidan O'Connell was called for intentional grounding in the end zone, bringing the halftime score to 16–7. The Boilermaker offense got it going in the third quarter when David Bell and Amad Anderson Jr each hauled in touchdown passes of Aidan O'Connell from 13 and 11 yards respectively. Northwestern would take the lead back from Purdue in the 4th quarter when Smith found Riley Lees on an 8-yard pass. Purdue would take the lead for good with 0:03 left in the game on a 39-yard field goal by J. D. Dellinger.

Wisconsin

 Sources:

Purdue would next travel to Madison, Wisconsin to face the Big Ten West division leaders, the Wisconsin Badgers.

Wisconsin blew out Purdue, 45–24. Wisconsin scored first when Aron Cruickshank scored on a 27-yard jet sweep for a touchdown. Purdue would score next when J. D. Dellinger connected on a 28-yard field goal. The Badgers scored again when Jonathan Taylor found paydirt from 51-yards out. Purdue took the lead in the second quarter when Aidan O'Connell found Brycen Hopkins twice from 7 and then Milton Wright found Hopkins for a 37-yard score. Wisconsin responded with an 18-yard touchdown reception by Jack Dunn from Jack Coan, and a 62-yard field goal by Zach Hintze to round out the halftime scoring with Wisconsin up 24–17. The Badgers began to pull away in the third quarter when Garrett Groshek scored from 6-yards out and again when Coan found Quintez Cephus for a 29-yard reception. Purdue responded just before the quarters end when O'Connell found David Bell on an 8-yard pass. Wisconsin capped the scoring when Mason Stokke scored on a 1-yard run to make the score 45–24.

Purdue scored 24 points and produced 376 yards of total offense, the most since scoring 26 points in 2003 and gaining 428 yards in 2005. David Bell became the first Purdue player since Chris Daniels in 1999 with three games of at least 12 receptions in a season. Brycen Hopkins became the first Purdue tight end since Tim Stratton in 1998 to score multiple touchdowns in at least two games in a season.

Indiana

 Sources:

Purdue would next return home to face the Big Ten East division rival and chief rival, the Indiana Hoosiers for the Old Oaken Bucket.

Indiana defeated Purdue, 44–41. Indiana got the lone score of the first quarter when Peyton Ramsey found Whop Philyor wide open in the back of the endzone. Ramsey scored again on a 1-yard run. Purdue scored for the first time when J. D. Dellinger made a 20-yard field goal, and again when Aidan O'Connell found Brycen Hopkins for a 72-yard pass. The Hoosiers would score when on a Sampson James run from 3-yards out to bring the halftime score to 21–10. Philyor would score again when Ramsey found him from 37-yards out.  Purdue began to mount its comeback when Zander Horvath scored a 1-yard touchdowns on back-to-back possessions. Charles Campbell would increase the Hoosiers lead when he connected on a 41-yard field goal. Purdue would finally tie the game with 2:48 remaining when O'Connell found David Bell with an acrobatic catch, with O'Connell then finding Hopkins to complete the 2-point conversion. Indiana scored first in overtime when Ramsey found Nick Westbrook-Ikhine for a 14-yard score. Facing 4th down, O'Connell found Hopkins for the tying touchdown on the same play as the two-point conversion to force a second overtime. When Purdue scored on a 34-yard Dellinger field goal, the Hoosiers scored the winning score when Ramsey ran a QB sneak from 1-yard out.

Purdue finished with a season-high 589 yards of total offense (408 passing, 181 rush); its only games with at least 400 passing yards and 181 rushing yards since at least 1997. Zander Horvath had 239 all-purpose yards, the most by a Purdue running back since Raheem Mostert had 270 in 2014 again Minnesota. David Bell finished the season with 86 receptions, the 8th most for a Purdue player in a single season. Brycen Hopkins finished his career 21st for total receptions (130) and 12th in career receiving yards (1,945).

Awards and honors

Players drafted into the NFL

References

Purdue
Purdue Boilermakers football seasons
Purdue Boilermakers football